Haitham Hazem Mohamed Hassan (born 8 November 1978) is an Egyptian former swimmer, who specialized in backstroke, butterfly, and individual medley events. He collected a total of six medals (one gold, one silver, and four bronze) from the All-Africa Games, and later represented Egypt at the 2000 Summer Olympics. While studying in the United States, Hassan was named 2000 Mid-Continent Conference Athlete of the Year and 2001 Swimmer of the Year by The Summit League. He also played for the Oakland University's swimming and diving team, under head coach Pete Hovland.

Career

College career
Hassan, a native of Alexandria, Egypt, started his sporting career in his early teenage years as a member of Alexandria Sports Club. At age nineteen, Hassan accepted an athletic scholarship to attend the Oakland University in Rochester, Michigan, where he played for the Oakland Golden Grizzlies swimming and diving team under head coach Pete Hovland. In 2000, he set Mid-Con records in the 100-yard butterfly (48.70) and 200-yard individual medley (1:50.60), and was also part of the 200-yard medley relay team that claimed a first-place finish at the Mid-Continental Conference Championships. In 2001, Hassan was named Men's Swimmer of the Year by The Summit League, after seizing a lead in the 100-yard butterfly (48.24), 200-yard butterfly (1:48.30), and 200-yard individual medley (1:49.70) from the same tournament. Hassan graduated from the University with a bachelor of science degree major in mechanical engineering.

International career
Hassan made his official worldwide debut, as a member of the Egyptian squad, at the 1999 All-Africa Games in Johannesburg, South Africa, where he earned a bronze medal in the 100 m backstroke at 59.91.

At the 2000 Summer Olympics in Sydney, Hassan competed only in three individual events. He posted FINA B-standards of 57.53 (100 m backstroke), 55.91 (100 m butterfly), and 2:07.51 (200 m individual medley) from the U.S. and Egyptian National Championships. Marching in the parade of nations during the opening ceremony, Hassan recalled his proudest moment: “I was so happy, I couldn’t take it, I was swimming the very next day, but I didn’t care about getting tired or worn out. I wanted to be there. I had to see the Opening Ceremonies". Two days after the opening, Hassan placed forty-fourth in the 100 m backstroke. Swimming in heat three, he rounded out the field to last place in 58.67, nearly a 1.4-second deficit behind winner Blaž Medvešek of Slovenia. In the 200 m individual medley, Hassan finished fifty-first in 2:09.92, more than two seconds off his entry time. The following day, in the 100 m butterfly, Hassan delivered a worst performance with a fifty-third-place effort on the morning prelims. Swimming in the same heat, he escaped from behind to earn a sixth seed in a time of 56.42. Frustrated and upset, he explained what went wrong from his final event: “I felt like I was moving my arms faster than I had ever done but I wasn’t catching any water. I was so mad, but I’m not a quitter.”

Three years later, at the 2003 All-Africa Games in Abuja, Nigeria, Hassan won a total of five medals, including his first ever gold in the 100 m butterfly (54.81). He also collected a silver in the 50 m butterfly (24.84), and three bronze each in the 50 m backstroke (27.30), 100 m backstroke (58.46), and 100 m freestyle (52.26).

In 2004, Hassan announced his retirement from a short-term career in swimming. He is currently working as a head coach for the American Swimming Academy in Alexandria, and also for swimmer Amr El Sayed, who competed for both the same collegiate and national team in middle-distance freestyle at the 2010 Summer Youth Olympics in Singapore.

Personal life
Following his only Olympic stint, Hassan married his longtime girlfriend Samar at a traditional Islamic ceremony in his hometown Alexandria before returning to Oakland University for his college swimming season.

References

External links
Honor Roll – Oakland University Swimming and Diving

1978 births
Living people
Egyptian male swimmers
Olympic swimmers of Egypt
Swimmers at the 2000 Summer Olympics
Male backstroke swimmers
Male butterfly swimmers
Male medley swimmers
Sportspeople from Alexandria
Oakland Golden Grizzlies men's swimmers
Oakland University alumni
African Games gold medalists for Egypt
African Games medalists in swimming
African Games silver medalists for Egypt
African Games bronze medalists for Egypt
Competitors at the 1999 All-Africa Games
Competitors at the 2003 All-Africa Games
20th-century Egyptian people